PostGIS is an open source software program that adds support for geographic objects to the PostgreSQL object-relational database. PostGIS follows the Simple Features for SQL specification from the Open Geospatial Consortium (OGC).

Technically PostGIS was implemented as a PostgreSQL external extension.

Features

 Geometry types for Points, LineStrings, Polygons, MultiPoints, MultiLineStrings, MultiPolygons, GeometryCollections, 3D types TINS and polyhedral surfaces, including solids.
 Spheroidal types under the geography datatype Points, LineStrings, Polygons, MultiPoints, MultiLineStrings, MultiPolygons and GeometryCollections.
 raster type - supports various pixel types and more than 1000 bands per raster. Since PostGIS 3, is a separate PostgreSQL extension called postgis_raster.
 SQL/MM Topology support - via PostgreSQL extension postgis_topology.
 Spatial predicates for determining the interactions of geometries using the 3x3 DE-9IM (provided by the GEOS software library).
 Spatial operators for determining geospatial measurements like area, distance, length and perimeter.
 Spatial operators for determining geospatial set operations, like union, difference, symmetric difference and buffers (provided by GEOS).
 R-tree-over-GiST (Generalized Search Tree) spatial indexes for high speed spatial querying.
 Index selectivity support, to provide high performance query plans for mixed spatial/non-spatial queries.

The PostGIS implementation is based on "light-weight" geometries and indexes optimized to reduce disk and memory footprint.  Using light-weight geometries helps servers increase the amount of data migrated up from physical disk storage into RAM, improving query performance substantially.

PostGIS is registered as "implements the specified standard" for "Simple Features for SQL" by the OGC. PostGIS has not been certified as compliant by the OGC.

History 
Refractions Research released the first version of PostGIS in 2001 under the GNU General Public License. After six release candidates, a stable "1.0" version followed on April 19, 2005.

In 2006 the OGC registered PostGIS   as "implement[ing] the specified standard" for "Simple Features for SQL".

Users
Many software products can use PostGIS as a database backend, including:
 ArcGIS (via GISquirrel, ST-Links SpatialKit, ZigGIS, ArcSDE and other third-party connectors)
 Cadcorp SIS
 CartoDB
 CockroachDB
 GeoMedia (via third-party connectors)
 GeoServer (GPL)
 GeoNetwork (GPL)
 GRASS GIS (GPL)
 gvSIG (GPL)
 Kosmo (GPL)
 Manifold System
 MapInfo Professional
 Mapnik (LGPL)
 MapServer (BSD)
 Maptitude
 MapGuide (LGPL)
 OpenJUMP (GPL)
 OpenStreetMap
 QGIS (GPL)
 SAGA GIS (GPL)
 TerraLib (LGPL)
 TerraView (GPL)
 uDig (LGPL)

See also 

 Well-known text and binary, descriptions of geospatial objects used within PostGIS
 DE-9IM, the Dimensionally Extended nine-Intersection Model used by PostGIS

References

External links
 

Free GIS software
PostgreSQL
Spatial database management systems